Jarri or Jari in Iran may refer to:
 Jarri, Fars
 Jari, Kerman